Sandžačka TV Mreža or STV is a Serbian commercial television channel with regional coverage dedicated to local news from territory of Sandžak and Raška. Company headquarters is located in Tutin, Bogoljuba Čukića 9 street.

See also 
 RTV Novi Pazar
 Sandžak TV
 Sanapress

References

External links

Television stations in Serbia
Television channels and stations established in 2017
Multilingual broadcasters